Indigenous health in Australia examines health and wellbeing indicators of Indigenous Australians compared with the rest of the population. Statistics indicate that Aboriginal Australians and Torres Strait Islanders are much less healthy than other Australians. Various government strategies have been put into place to try to remediate the problem; there has been some improvement in several areas, but statistics between Indigenous Australians and the rest of the Australian population still show unacceptable levels of difference.

Colonisation and ongoing disadvantage
Prior to European colonisation, it is likely that the health Indigenous Australians was better than poorer sections of Europe. Colonisation impacted the health of Indigenous Australians via land dispossession, social marginalisation, political oppression, incarceration, acculturation and population decline. The process of colonisation began with the arrival of the First Fleet in 1788. In the following decades, foreign diseases, dispossession, exploitation, warfare and violence proved devastating for the Indigenous population, and the immediate effect was a widespread increase in mortality and disease. By the end of the 19th century, Indigenous Australians were greatly reduced in numbers and the survivors were largely confined to remote reserves and missions. They were associated in the public mind with disease, which led to exclusion from institutions and isolation from non-Indigenous society for fear of contamination. These colonial policies resulted in segregated oppression and a lack of access to adequate medical care, leading to further disease and mortality.

The Australian government proceeded to deny the Indigenous people of their civil rights, including property rights; the ability to work and receive wages; and access to medical care and educational institutions. Legislation also allowed for the separation of Indigenous families, with guardianship being awarded to government officials called Protectors of Aborigines. Indigenous children forcibly removed from their families under Protection legislation in the first half of the 20th century are referred to as the Stolen Generations. Many of these children were neglected, abused, and denied of an education. The Australian government forced the Indigenous populations to assimilate into the colonisers’ culture through schools and programs, where Indigenous languages were banned and any resistance to these practices could result in imprisonment or death. This process of acculturation has led to trauma, including historical, inter-generational, and social trauma. Issues such as anxiety, stress, grief, and sadness are produced from this trauma, which have led to higher suicide rates, violence, substance abuse and incarceration of Indigenous peoples today.

Social, political and economic factors that result from colonisation present barriers to quality healthcare, health education, and health behaviours. Acculturation has produced xenophobia, which has socially marginalized Indigenous people and excluded them from society. Social inclusion is a social determinant of health, and social marginalisation allows for injustices against Indigenous people to persist. Political disempowerment prevented them from accessing social services, sickness benefits, and from voting until the 1960s. Socio-economic inequality has resulted in poor employment opportunities, housing, education and healthcare. One in seven Indigenous Australians reported difficulty in accessing healthcare for their children, which include transportation costs and prescription costs. Displacement and disenfranchisement prevents access to healthcare resources such as screening programs, and results in delayed or inadequate treatment. An example of this can be seen in the high rates of cervical cancer, where a meta-analysis of Indigenous women from Australia, New Zealand, Canada and the United States attributed these rates to “socio-economic disenfranchisement resulting from colonialism”, rather than genetics.

The displacement of Indigenous Australians to reserves and the isolation from society led to generations suffering from starvation and malnutrition. This has had profound effects on physical and intellectual development; Indigenous communities today in remote locations continue to suffer from malnutrition and chronic health problems, as well as lower levels of education. The persistence of inequality in educational attainment among contemporary Indigenous communities is viewed as a product of historical, political and social factors. European colonisers believed that Indigenous people were intellectually inferior, and education was thus denied as it was considered pointless.  Low levels of education increase the likelihood of engaging in high risk health behaviours, as well as lower rates of participation in health screening and treatment. However, poor health behaviours and low utilisation of healthcare resources can be due to a combination of many factors. Racial discrimination towards Indigenous peoples that stems from processes of colonialism leads to a cumulative exposure to racism, and this is related to negative health outcomes. It produces feelings of anger and shame, which limits active participation in the mainstream healthcare system and society at large.

The outstation movement of the 1970s and 1980s, when Aboriginal people moved to tiny remote settlements on traditional land, brought health benefits, but funding them proved expensive, training and employment opportunities were not provided in many cases, and support from governments dwindled in the 2000s, particularly in the era of the Howard government.

Health issues cannot be separated from social and cultural factors such as racism, discrimination, cultural disconnection and lack of employment and educational opportunities. Colonisation has had an ongoing impact. Overcrowding and poor housing contributes to poor health and family dysfunction and violence. High rates of incarceration of adults and youth contribute to early death and poor mental health.

Hospitalisation rate
Indigenous Australians go to hospital at a higher rate than non-Indigenous Australians. In 2010–11, Indigenous Australians used hospitals 2.5 times more frequently than non-Indigenous people. This rate comes from an age-standardised separation rate (hospital check-out) of 911 per 1,000 for Indigenous people.

The 2010–11 age-standardised separation rate for Indigenous people living in the NT was 1,704 per 1,000, 7.9 times the rate for non-Indigenous people. About 80% of the difference between these rates was due to higher separations for Indigenous people admitted for dialysis. The 2020 AIHW reported that Indigenous children are more likely to get hospitalized and experience tooth decay.  Lack of access to the right diet, dental services, and other social disadvantages are reported as contributing factors to such poor health.

Life expectancy
From 1996 to 2001, the Australian Bureau of Statistics (ABS) used indirect methods for its calculations, because census results were deemed to be unreliable, and figures published in 2005 (59.4 years for males and 64.8 years for females) indicated a widely quoted gap of 17 years between indigenous and non-indigenous life expectancy, though the ABS does not now consider the 2005 figures to be reliable.

The Social Justice Report: 2005 by the Australian Human Rights Commission reported a seventeen-year gap between the life expectancy of Indigenous Australians and non-Indigenous Australians. This prompted health and human rights activists to establish the "Close the Gap" campaign, which focused on health equality for Indigenous Australians, including increasing life expectancy, and associated factors such as housing.

In 2009, after previous methods of comparing life expectancy rates proved unreliable, a new method was developed by the ABS, based on tracing the deaths of people identified as Indigenous at the 2006 census. In 2009 the ABS estimated life expectancy at 67.2 years for Indigenous men (11.5 years fewer than for non-Indigenous) and 72.9 years for Indigenous women (9.7 years fewer than for non-Indigenous). Estimated life expectancy of Indigenous men ranged from 61.5 years for those living in the Northern Territory to a high of 69.9 years for those living in New South Wales, and for Indigenous women, 69.2 years for those living in the Northern Territory to a high of 75.0 years for those living in New South Wales.

As of 2010, life expectancy for Aboriginal and Torres Strait Islander men was estimated to be 11.5 years less than that of non-Indigenous men – 67.2 years and 78.7 years respectively. For Aboriginal and Torres Strait Islander women, the 2010 figures show a difference of 9.7 years – 72.9 years for Aboriginal and Torres Strait Islander women and 82.6 years for non-Indigenous women. Indigenous Australians are more likely to die at a younger age than their non-indigenous counterparts due to being unhealthy.

A 2013 study, referring to the national Indigenous reform policy launched in 2008, Closing the Gap (see below), looked at the difficulties in interpreting the extent of the gap because of differing methods of estimating life expectancy between 2007 and 2012. It concluded: 

The 2019 report by the Close the Gap campaign reported that the gap in life expectancy was "widening rather than closing". The 2022 AIHW report showed that the cancer death rate rose from 205 to 235 per 100,000.

Government initiatives
In 1989, the National Aboriginal Health Strategy was created.

Another attempt by the federal government to address health issues was via the creation of the Office of Aboriginal and Torres Strait Islander Health (OATSIH) in 1994, but this is no longer in existence.
 
In 2007/08, the Australian government focused mainly on decreasing "overcrowding" within remote indigenous communities in endeavours to improve health in rural populations. The Implementation of Australian Rural Accommodation (ARIA) Programme was granted  over four years to induce a significant level of housing reform.

The Aboriginal and Torres Strait Islander population comprised 2.5% of the Australian population at this time.

In 2010–2011, Governments funded 91.4% of health expenditure for Indigenous people, compared with 68.1% for non-Indigenous people.

In July 2018, Health Minister Greg Hunt and Ken Wyatt, then Minister for Indigenous Health, announced  in funding for 28 new health initiatives through the National Health and Medical Research Council (NHMRC), including expanding renal health units in remote parts so that patients could stay on country with their families. The NHMRC also launched a plan to help direct Indigenous health and research investment for the next ten years.

Closing the Gap

The Council of Australian Governments initiated the first multi-sector approach in regards to initiating strategies to overcome the large discrepancy between Indigenous and European health statistics. The strategy, named Closing the Gap, was launched in 2008. The plan's success was dependent on the level of collaboration between all levels of the Australian Government, Indigenous leaders/communities and the health sector.

Although there was some improvement in some areas, only two out of its seven targets were met.  In July 2019, at the end of the first 10-year phase of Closing the Gap, the National Indigenous Australians Agency was established in July 2019, under the Minister for Indigenous Australians, Ken Wyatt, and this agency is now responsible for "lead[ing] and coordinat[ing] the development and implementation of Australia’s Closing the Gap targets in partnership with Indigenous Australians".

Health status

Overall

In 2009, 26% of Indigenous Australians living in remote areas experienced 40% of the health gap of Indigenous Australians overall.

The most common cause of hospital admissions for Indigenous Australians is for kidney dialysis treatment, .

A 2007 study by the University of Queensland found that the 11 largest preventable contributions to the Indigenous burden of disease in Queensland were from the joint contribution of 11 risk factors, with the top three being high body mass (12.1%), tobacco (11.6%), and inadequate physical activity (7.9%). high cholesterol, alcohol, high blood pressure, low intake of fruit and vegetables, intimate partner violence, illicit drugs, child sexual abuse and unsafe sex completed the list. A 2014 follow-up report concluded that the "leading causes of disease and injury burden in the Aboriginal and Torres Strait Islander population were largely the same as in the non-Indigenous population: mental disorders, cardiovascular disease, diabetes, chronic respiratory disease and cancers" in the 2007 study. However, the rate and age distribution between the two populations are very different. Mental disorders and cardiovascular disease account for almost a third of the burden, with diabetes, chronic respiratory disease and cancers the next three leading causes. Also, Indigenous people carried a disproportionate share of the total disease burden for the state, increasing as remoteness increased. The study also highlighted the lack of data on epidemiology of many of the conditions suffered by the Indigenous population.

Summary table (2003)
Health problems with the highest disparity (compared with the non-Indigenous population) in incidence as of 2003  are outlined in the table below:

Each of these indicators is expected to underestimate the true prevalence of disease in the population due to reduced levels of diagnosis.

In addition, the following factors have been at least partially implicated in the inequality in life expectancy:
 poverty
 insufficient education
 substance abuse
 for remote communities, poor access to health services
 for urbanised Indigenous Australians, cultural pressures which prevent access to health services
 cultural differences resulting in poor communication between Indigenous Australians and health workers

Diabetes

In some areas of Australia, particular the Torres Strait Islands, the prevalence of type 2 diabetes among Indigenous Australians is between 25 and 30%. In Central Australia high incidences of type-2 diabetes has led to high chronic kidney disease rates amongst Aboriginals.  The most common cause of hospital admissions for Indigenous Australians in mainland Australia was for dialysis treatment. Indigenous women experience twice the adjusted-age risk of gestational diabetes, thus leading to Indigenous women having a higher risk of developing type 2 diabetes after pregnancy and birth. Compared with the general Australian population, Indigenous Australians develop type 2 diabetes at a younger age.

Cancers
The incidence rate of cancer in Indigenous Australians compared with non-Indigenous Australians has varied between 2009 and 2017 and by state, but mostly showing a higher rate at between 1.1% and 1.4% for all cancers. Lung and breast cancers were the most common in the Indigenous population, and both lung and liver cancers were more common in the Indigenous than non-Indigenous population. Overall mortality rate from cancer was higher in New South Wales, Victoria, Queensland, WA, and the NT 2007–2014 (50% vs 65%, or 1.3 times as likely to die); this may be because they are less likely to receive the necessary treatments in time, or because the cancers that they tend to develop are often more lethal than other cancers. The 2022 AIHW report showed that the cancer death rate rose from 205 to 235 per 100,000.

Human T-lymphotropic virus 1

In central Australia, Indigenous Australians have human T-lymphotropic virus 1 at a rate thousands of times higher than non-Indigenous Australians.

Smoking
In 2008, 45% of Aboriginal and Torres Strait Islander adults were current daily smokers. Smoking is one of the main factors contributing to chronic disease. Amongst Indigenous Australians 1 in 5 mortalities are caused by smoking. If the number of smoking Indigenous Australians is reduced to equal the number of non-smoking non-Indigenous individuals there is a potential decrease of 420 mortalities among Aboriginal and Torres Strait Islanders. In 2010 the Australian Government have put in place a 10-year program aimed at improving the health of Indigenous and Torres Strait Island. Specific types of cancer including lung and cervical cancer occurs to 52% of indigenous women due to their smoking habit.

Mental health
In 2010, the rate of high or very high levels of psychological distress for Aboriginal and Torres Strait Islander adults was more than twice that of non-Indigenous Australians. A 2007 study in The Lancet found that the four greatest preventable contributions to the Indigenous mental health burden of disease were: alcohol consumption, illicit drugs, child sexual abuse and intimate partner violence. Up to 15% of the 10 year life expectancy gap compared to non-Indigenous Australians has been attributed to mental health disorders. Mental health should be taken into consideration in the Aboriginal concept of health and well being. In the incidence of children and the elderly many problems tend to be hidden. Some of the behavioural problems encountered tend to be linked to neurodevelopment delay and a failing education system.

Mental health, suicide and self-harm remain major concerns, with the suicide rate being double that of the non-Indigenous population in 2015, and young people experiencing rising mental health rates.

A 2017 article in The Lancet described the suicide rate among Indigenous Australians as a "catastrophic crisis":

The report advocates Indigenous-led national response to the crisis, asserting that suicide prevention programmes have failed this segment of the population. The ex-prisoner population of Australian Aboriginal people is particularly at risk of committing suicide; organisations such as Ngalla Maya have been set up to offer assistance.

There are high incidences of anxiety, depression, PTSD and suicide amongst the Stolen Generations, with this resulting in unstable parenting and family situations.

Some mental health problems are attributed to the inter-generational trauma brought about by the Stolen Generations.

There are known links between mental health and substance abuse.

The 2019 ABS data showed that about 24% of Indigenous people, including children with 23% of males and 25% of females distribution, experienced mental health issues. The survey indicated that anxiety is the most common condition with females suffering at 21% and males at a lower, 12%.

Substance abuse

Many Indigenous communities suffer from a range of health, social and legal problems associated with substance abuse of both legal and illegal drugs, including but not limited to alcohol abuse, petrol sniffing, the use illegal drugs such as methamphetamines and cannabis and smoking tobacco.

Tobacco use has been estimated to be the "greatest contributor (23%) to the gap in the disease burden between Indigenous and non-Indigenous Australians", with Indigenous people more than 2.5% likely to smoke daily than non-Indigenous Australians. The 2004–05 National Aboriginal and Torres Strait Islander Health Survey (NATSIHS) by the ABS found that, after adjusting for age differences between the two populations, Indigenous adults were more than twice as likely as non-Indigenous adults to be current daily smokers of tobacco.

NATSIHS 2004/5 found that the proportion of the Indigenous adult population engaged in "risky" and "high-risk" alcohol consumption (15%) was comparable with that of the non-Indigenous population (14%), based on age-standardised data. The definition of "risky" and "high-risk" consumption used is four or more standard drinks per day average for males, two or more for females. The 2007 National Drug Strategy Household Survey reported that Indigenous peoples were "more likely than other Australians to abstain from alcohol consumption (23.4% versus 16.8%) and also more likely to consume alcohol at risky or high-risk levels for harm in the short term (27.4% versus 20.1%)". These NDSHS comparisons are non-age-standardised; the paper notes that Indigenous figures are based on a sample of 372 people and care should be exercised when using Indigenous figures.

A 2016 study reported that in the Northern Territory (which has the greatest proportion of Indigenous Australians than any other state or territory, at 32%), per capita alcohol consumption for adults was 1.5 times the national average. In addition to the health risks associated with alcohol use, there is a relationship among alcohol abuse, violence and trauma. There has been increasing media attention to this problem, but it defies simple analysis or solutions as the issues are complex and intertwined. The study attempted to collate existing data on the problems and attempts to address them, concluding that more funding is needed to investigate the feasibility and suitability of the various interventional approaches in the Northern Territory.

Indigenous Australians were 1.6 times as likely abstain completely from alcohol than non-Indigenous people in 2012–3. Twice as many men as women drink alcohol, and more likely to drink to risky levels. Foetal alcohol syndrome has been a problem, but the rate of pregnant women drinking had dropped from 20% in 2008 to 10% in 2015. To combat the problem, a number of programs to prevent or mitigate alcohol abuse have been attempted in different regions, many initiated from within the communities themselves. These strategies include such actions as the declaration of "dry zones" within Indigenous communities, prohibition and restriction on point-of-sale access, and community policing and licensing. In the 1980s, the psychoactive drug kava was introduced into the NT by Pacific Islander missionaries as an alternative to alcohol, as a safer alternative to alcohol. In 2007, commercial import of kava was banned, but Fiji and Vanuatu have asked the government to lift the ban.

Petrol sniffing has been a problem among some remote Indigenous communities. Petrol vapour produces euphoria and dulling effect in those who inhale it, and due to its widespread availability, became a popular drug. Proposed solutions to the problem became a topic of heated debate among politicians and the community at large. In 2005 this problem among remote Indigenous communities was considered so serious that a new, low aromatic petrol Opal was distributed across the Northern Territory to combat it. A 2018 longitudinal study by the University of Queensland, commissioned by the National Indigenous Australians Agency,  reported that the number of people sniffing petrol in the 25 communities studied had declined by 95.2%, from 453 to just 22. However volatile substance misuse (VSM) was found to continue to occur in several communities, mostly occasionally and opportunistically.

The 2018 UQ study also reported that alcohol and cannabis were the drugs causing most concern in many of the 25 communities studied. "Alcohol was reported as being in regular use in 22 communities, and occasionally present in two others. Cannabis was reported as being in regular use in all 25 communities, and a serious problem in 20 communities. Ice was reported to be present in 8 of the 25 communities" (although mostly only occasional use).

Violence and accidents
Aboriginal and Torres Strait Islander Australians, particularly males, are far more likely than the rest of the community to experience injury and death from accidents and violence.

Infant mortality
The Aboriginal and Torres Strait Islander infant mortality rate varies across Australia. In New South Wales, the rate was 7.7 deaths per 1,000 live births in 2006–2008, compared with the non-Indigenous infant mortality rate of 4.3 deaths per 1,000 live births. In the Northern Territory, the Aboriginal and Torres Strait Islander infant mortality rate was over three times as high as the non-Indigenous infant mortality rate (13.6 deaths per 1,000 live births compared with 3.8 deaths per 1,000 live births).

Male Aboriginal and Torres Strait Islander infant mortality in the Northern Territory was about 15 deaths per 1,000 live births, while female Aboriginal and Torres Strait Islander infant mortality was 12 deaths per 1,000. For non-Indigenous males the rate was 4.4 deaths per 1,000 births and for females it was 3.3 deaths per 1,000 (ABS 2009b).

Between 1998 and 2008 the Indigenous to non-Indigenous rate ratio (the Aboriginal and Torres Strait Islander rate divided by the rate for other Australians) for infant mortality declined in the Northern Territory an average of 1.7% per year, while the rate difference (the Aboriginal and Torres Strait Islander rate minus the rate for other Australians) almost halved from 18.1 to 9.8 deaths per 1,000 births, which suggests that the gap between Aboriginal and Torres Strait Islander and non-Indigenous infant mortality in the Northern Territory has reduced (ABS 2009b).

Pneumococcal disease
Indigenous Australians have a higher rate of Invasive pneumococcal disease (IPD) than the wider Australian population. In Western Australia between 1997–2007, the IPD incidence rate was 47 cases per 100,000 population per year among Aboriginal people and 7 cases per 100,000 population per year in non-Aboriginal people.

After the introduction of a pneumococcal conjugate vaccine (7vPCV), total IPD rates among Aboriginal children decreased by 46% for those less than 2 years of age and by 40% for those 2–4 years of age. Rates decreased by 64% and 51% in equivalent age groups for non-Aboriginal children.

Oral health
Until the 1980s Aboriginal children were recognised as having better oral health than non-Aboriginal children. Today, average rates of tooth decay in Aboriginal children are twice as high as non-Aboriginal children. Between 1991 and 2001, the rate of tooth decay amongst Aboriginal children living in metropolitan areas fell, going against the increase in child tooth decay in remote areas. A study performed in 2001-2002 showed that Indigenous Australian patients showed a higher ratio of missing or decayed teeth than European patients, but a lower ratio of filled teeth.

A 2003 study found that complete loss of all natural teeth was higher for Aboriginal people of all age groups (16.2%) compared to non-Aboriginal people (10.2%). In remote communities, those with diabetes were found to have over three times the number of missing teeth than those without diabetes. Type 2 diabetes has been related to poor oral health.

Changes in the Australian Indigenous diet away from a traditional diet, which had originally contained high levels of protein and vitamins. High in fibre and sugar and low in saturated fats – to a diet high in sugar, saturated fats and refined carbohydrates has negatively affected the oral health of Indigenous Australians.

A 1999 study found that the water in rural and remote areas of Australia is less likely to be fluoridated than metropolitan areas, reducing access for many Aboriginal communities to fluoridated water. Fluoridated water has been shown to prevent dental decay.

Hearing loss
Aboriginals experience a high level of conductive hearing loss largely due to the massive incidence of middle ear disease among the young in Aboriginal communities. Aboriginal children experience middle ear disease for two and a half years on average during childhood compared with three months for non indigenous children. If untreated it can leave a permanent legacy of hearing loss. The higher incidence of deafness in turn contributes to poor social, educational and emotional outcomes for the children concerned. Such children as they grow into adults are also more likely to experience employment difficulties and find themselves caught up in the criminal justice system. Research in 2012 revealed that nine out of ten Aboriginal prison inmates in the Northern Territory suffer from significant hearing loss.

Health dynamics
A number of factors help to explain why Aboriginal and Torres Strait Islander people have poorer health than other Australians. In general, Aboriginal and Torres Strait Islander people are more likely to have lower levels of education, lower health education, higher unemployment, inadequate housing and access to infrastructure than other Australians.

In particular, crowded housing has been identified as contributing to the spread of infectious diseases. Aboriginal and Torres Strait Islander Australians are also more likely to smoke, have poor diets and have high levels of obesity.

A 2007 study found that the 11 largest preventable contributions to the indigenous burden of disease in Australia were tobacco, alcohol, illicit drugs, high body mass, inadequate physical activity, low intake of fruit and vegetables, high blood pressure, high cholesterol, unsafe sex, child sexual abuse and intimate partner violence. The 11 risk factors considered together explain 37% of the total burden of disease experienced by Indigenous Australians. The remaining 63% consists of a range of known and unknown risk factors, yet to be identified or quantified.

Contemporary diet
Poor-quality diet among the Indigenous population is a significant risk factor for three of the major causes of premature death in Indigenous Australians – cardiovascular disease, cancer and type 2 diabetes. Much of this burden of disease is due to extremely poor nutrition throughout life.

A 2013 study of Indigenous dietary patterns in Northern Territory communities found there was a high expenditure on beverages and corresponding high intake of sugar-sweetened beverages coupled with low expenditure (and low intakes) of fruit and vegetables. Similarly high per capita consumption of sugar-sweetened beverages has also been reported among Aboriginal and Torres Strait Islander children at the national level.

Modern Aboriginal Australians living in rural areas tend to have nutritionally poor diets, where higher food costs drive people to consume cheaper, lower quality foods. The average diet is high in refined carbohydrates and salt, and low in fruit and vegetables. There are several challenges in improving diets for Aboriginal Australians, such as shorter shelf lives of fresh foods, resistance to changing existing consumption habits, and disagreements on how to implement changes. Some suggest the use of taxes on unhealthy foods and beverages to discourage their consumption, but this approach is questionable. Providing subsidies for healthy foods has proven effective in other countries, but has yet to be proven useful for Aboriginal Australians specifically.

Cross-cultural miscommunication
Among the factors that have been at least partially implicated in the inequality in life expectancy between Indigenous and non-Indigenous people in Australia are cultural differences resulting in poor communication between Indigenous Australians and health workers.

According to Michael Walsh and Ghil'ad Zuckermann, Western conversational interaction is typically "dyadic", between two particular people, where eye contact is important and the speaker controls the interaction; and "contained" in a relatively short, defined time frame. However, traditional Aboriginal conversational interaction is "communal", broadcast to many people, eye contact is not important, the listener controls the interaction; and "continuous", spread over a longer, indefinite time frame.

Hospital partnerships with traditional healers
The ngangkari are traditional healers of the Anangu Aboriginal people of the Western Desert cultural bloc, who have been invited to partner with hospitals in South Australia to offer traditional healing services.

Studies relating to Aboriginal people only
The following studies are confined to Aboriginal peoples only, although not necessarily only true of those populations:

A 2015 study showed that Aboriginal Australians have disproportionately high rates of severe physical disability, as much as three times that of non-Aboriginal Australians, possibly due to higher rates of chronic diseases such as diabetes and kidney disease. The study found that obesity and smoking rates were higher among Aboriginal people, which are contributing factors or causes of serious health issues. The study also showed that Aboriginal Australians were more likely to self-report their health as "excellent/very good" in spite of extant severe physical limitations.
One study reports that Aboriginal Australians are significantly affected by infectious diseases, particularly in rural areas. These diseases include strongyloidiasis, hookworm caused by Ancylostoma duodenale, scabies, and streptococcal infections. Because poverty is also prevalent in Aboriginal populations, the need for medical assistance is even greater in many Aboriginal Australian communities. The researchers suggested the use of mass drug administration (MDA) as a method of combating the diseases found commonly among Aboriginal peoples, while also highlighting the importance of "sanitation, access to clean water, good food, integrated vector control and management, childhood immunisations, and personal and family hygiene".
A study examining the psychosocial functioning of high-risk-exposed and low-risk-exposed Aboriginal Australians aged 12–17 found that in high-risk youths, personal well-being was protected by a sense of solidarity and common low socioeconomic status. However, in low-risk youths, perceptions of racism caused poor psychosocial functioning. The researchers suggested that factors such as racism, discrimination and alienation contributed to physiological health risks in ethnic minority families. The study also mentioned the effect of poverty on Aboriginal populations: higher morbidity and mortality rates.
Aboriginal Australians suffer from high rates of heart disease. Cardiovascular diseases are the leading cause of death worldwide and among Aboriginal Australians. Aboriginal people develop atrial fibrillation, a condition that sharply increases the risk of stroke, much earlier than non-Aboriginal Australians on average. The life expectancy for Aboriginal Australians is 10 years lower than non-Aboriginal Australians. Technologies such as the Wireless ambulatory ECG are being developed to screen at-risk individuals, particularly rural Australians, for atrial fibrillation.

See also
 Animal Management in Rural and Remote Indigenous Communities (AMMRIC)
Australian Indigenous HealthInfoNet - internet resource
 COVID-19 pandemic: impact on Indigenous Australians
 Health in Australia
 New World Syndrome
 Race and health

References

Further reading

 

 Contribution to the discussion about the next phase of the Closing the Gap Strategy.

History of Indigenous Australians
Healthcare in Australia
Children's health in Australia
Mental health in Australia
Health policy in Australia
Aboriginal Australian health